Sumangali Cable Vision (SCV) is a leading Indian multi service operator with presence in Tamil Nadu.

References

External links
 Official website

Mass media companies of India
Companies based in Chennai
Mass media in Chennai
Mass media in Tamil Nadu
Cable television companies of India
Sun Group
Companies with year of establishment missing